Special Album is the first and only compilation album by South Korean girl group Baby V.O.X. It was released on March 30, 2002 by DR Music. The single "Coincidence" was used to promote the 2002 FIFA World Cup; a special World Cup-themed video for the song was released. "Go" was later used for their debut mini album in Japan in 2003. "Coincidence" marked their first number one hit in three years since their single "Get Up". Special Album is their best selling album to date, selling over 440,000 copies.

The album came with three CDs, one VCD, and a photobook containing pictures of the members. The first CD contains the two new songs plus a non-stop dance mix, mostly of previous singles. The second CD contains another dance mix, and the third CD is a collection of ballads from previous albums. The VCD contains the music video for "Coincidence" plus exclusive footage of the group.

Track listing 
Adapted from album notes (Singapore version).

Members during this release 

Kim E-Z

Shim Eun-Jin

Kan Mi-Youn

Yoon Eun-Hye

Lee Hee-Jin

References 

2002 albums
Baby V.O.X. albums